Jacinto  "Gelson" Dala (born 13 July 1996) is an Angolan footballer who plays for Al-Wakrah in the Qatar Stars League on loan from Portuguese club Rio Ave. He can play as an attacking midfielder or a forward.

Club career
Born in Luanda, Gelson began his career with local C.D. Primeiro de Agosto. In July 2015, it was reported that he was being scouted by Portugal's S.L. Benfica. He scored 23 goals in 27 games as his team won the Girabola in 2016, and subsequently he and teammate Ary Papel signed for Sporting Clube de Portugal for undisclosed fees on contracts with €60 million release clauses.

After arriving in Lisbon in January 2017, Gelson made his debut for Sporting B in LigaPro on 15 January, playing the full 90 minutes of a 4–0 loss at Portimonense. Eight days later he scored his first goal, opening a 1–1 home draw with S.C. Covilhã. He totalled 13 goals in 17 games in his first season in the league, including four on 2 April in a 5–1 win over S.C. Olhanense. He was first called up to Jorge Jesus' main squad for the Primeira Liga match at C.D. Feirense on 13 May, remaining unused in a 2–1 loss, but made his top flight debut eight days later in the final match of the season, replacing namesake Gelson Martins at the end of a 4–1 win over G.D. Chaves at the Estádio José Alvalade.

Back in the reserves on 30 September 2017, Gelson scored a hat-trick in a 4–3 home win over C.D. Santa Clara.

International career
Gelson made his international debut for Angola on 13 June 2015 in a 2017 Africa Cup of Nations qualification match against the Central African Republic at the Estádio Nacional da Tundavala, scoring twice in a 4–0 victory. On 4 July, he scored both goals in a win over Swaziland in Luanda to win the tie 4–2 on aggregate in the preliminary round of 2016 African Nations Championship qualification.

Career statistics

Club

International goals
Scores and results list Angola's goal tally first.

Honours
Angola
Four Nations Tournament bronze medal: 2018

Notes

References

External links 
 
 Gelson 1º de Agosto profile
 

Living people
1996 births
Association football forwards
Angolan footballers
Angolan expatriate footballers
Angola international footballers
2019 Africa Cup of Nations players
C.D. Primeiro de Agosto players
Rio Ave F.C. players
Sporting CP footballers
Sporting CP B players
Antalyaspor footballers
Al-Wakrah SC players
Primeira Liga players
Liga Portugal 2 players
Süper Lig players
Qatar Stars League players
Footballers from Luanda
Expatriate footballers in Portugal
Expatriate footballers in Turkey
Expatriate footballers in Qatar
Angolan expatriate sportspeople in Portugal
Angolan expatriate sportspeople in Turkey
Angolan expatriate sportspeople in Qatar
Angola A' international footballers
2016 African Nations Championship players